Hans-Josef Becker (born 8 June 1948) is a German prelate of the Catholic Church who was the archbishop of Paderborn in Germany from 2003 to 2022.

Life
He completed his advanced level examination in 1967, in Rüthen. Subsequently, he completed a teaching study, which was confirmed with a second state examination in 1972. There after, he studied theology and philosophy in Paderborn and Munich. On 11 June 1977 he was ordained to the priesthood by Archbishop Johannes Joachim Degenhardt.

From 1979 to 1995, he worked as a pastor in Paderborn and Lippstadt. In the following four years, Becker led the Central Department of Pastoral Personnel (Zentralabteilung Pastorales Personal) for the Archbishopric of Paderborn. In 1999, he was appointed the auxiliary bishop of Paderborn by Pope John Paul II. After the death of Archbishop Degenhardt in the year 2002, Becker functioned for about a year as more of a diocesan administrator, before he was appointed as Archbishop of Paderborn on 28 September 2003.

Since 2006, Becker has been a chairman of the Commission for Education and Schools in the Conference of the German Bishops.

Pope Francis accepted his resignation on 1 October 2022.

Literature

Sources
Translated from the German Wikipedia (24 March 2007)

External links

 Archbishop Hans-Josef Becker at Catholic-Hierarchy.com
  Official website

1948 births
Living people
People from Warstein
Archbishops of Paderborn
21st-century Roman Catholic archbishops in Germany